Millwheel or water wheel are sometimes used as a charge in heraldic arms. The water wheel is often used to symbolize the food processing industry or industry in general.

The heraldric millwheel is usually stylized and may look different in the heraldic traditions of different countries.

Examples

See also
 Millrind
 Mill (heraldry)
 History of heraldry

Heraldic charges
Watermills